The Métascouac River is a tributary of the east bank of the Métabetchouane River (via the Petit lac Métascouac), flowing in the central west part of the Laurentides Wildlife Reserve, in the administrative region of Capitale-Nationale, in the province of Quebec, in Canada. The course of the river crosses the regional county municipalities of:
 La Côte-de-Beaupré Regional County Municipality: unorganized territory of Lac-Jacques-Cartier;
 La Jacques-Cartier Regional County Municipality: unorganized territory of Lac-Croche.

Forestry is the main economic activity in this valley; recreational tourism, second.

The surface of the Métascouac River (except the rapids zones) is usually frozen from the end of November to the beginning of April, however the safe circulation on the ice is generally done from mid-December to the end of March.

Geography 
The main watersheds neighboring the Métascouac River are:
 north side: Métascouac Lake, Berthiaume Lake, Lac aux Écorces, Rivière aux Écorces;
 east side: Canuck stream, rivière aux Écorces North-East, Métascouac South River;
 south side: Petit lac Métascouac, Métabetchouane River, Métabetchouane East River and Rivière de la Place;
 west side: Métabetchouane River, Saint-Henri Lake.

The Métascouac river has its source at the mouth of Lac Goulet (length:  in the shape of a Y whose mouth (south side) is at the base of the letter;). This landlocked lake is fed by: the outlet (coming from the southwest) from the Ocre and Linaigrettes lakes; the outlet (coming from the west) of Lac Chaillot; the outlet (coming from the northwest) from Lac de la Marge; the outlet (coming from the north-east) from Affatt Lake.

  south-east, to the outlet (coming from the west) of Lac Blanchette;
  towards the south in a deep valley, until the discharge (coming from the west) of the lakes of Néréides, Thétis, Goizel, Berthiaume and Métascouac;
  towards the south-east, meandering at the end of the segment crossing a marsh zone, until the confluence of the Métascouac South River (coming from the east);

From the confluence of the Métascouac river, the current flows over:
  southwards crossing Petit lac Métascouac;
  north along the course of the Métabetchouane River to the south shore of lac Saint-Jean;
  towards the northeast by crossing lac Saint-Jean;
  towards the east by taking the course of the Saguenay River via la Petite Décharge, until Tadoussac where it merges with the Saint Lawrence estuary.

Toponymy 
The toponym "rivière Métascouac" was formalized on December 5, 1968, at the Place Names Bank of the Commission de toponymie du Québec.

See also 
 St. Lawrence River
 List of rivers of Quebec

References

External links 

Rivers of Capitale-Nationale
La Jacques-Cartier Regional County Municipality
La Côte-de-Beaupré Regional County Municipality
Laurentides Wildlife Reserve